The Canal entre Champagne et Bourgogne (literally Canal between Champagne and Burgundy), previously named Canal de la Marne à la Saône (literally Canal of the Marne to the Saône), is a canal in north-eastern France connecting the towns of Vitry-le-François and Maxilly-sur-Saône. It is a summit level canal of Freycinet dimensions connecting the Marne and the Saône. It is 224.191 kilometres long, and has 114 locks (71 on the Marne side and 43 on the Saône side) and two tunnels, Condes which is 275 metres long and the tunnel on the summit level between Balesmes-sur-Marne and Noidant-Chatenoy, 4820 metres long. which runs almost exactly underneath the source of the Marne.

Altitude at Vitry-le-François: 104 m
Altitude at Maxilly-sur-Saône: 187 m
Altitude of summit level: 345 m
The canal was recently renamed "Canal entre Champagne et Bourgogne" for the purpose of promoting tourism, but barge skippers often call it the "canal d'Heuilley". This is in reference to Heuilley-sur-Saône, the name of the lock and lock-cut on the Petite-Saône which the canal joins, although the actual junction lies within the neighbouring commune Maxilly-sur-Saône. It is a standard process among bargemen to name the canal after the location where it starts. For example, the Canal Vire-et-Taute in Cotentin was called "canal des Ourmes" the name of its first lock, "les Ormes".

History
Work began on the extension of the old canal of the Haute-Marne in 1880, and the canal opened in 1907, the last to be built of the Freycinet canal network in central France.

En route
 PK 0 Vitry-le-François
 PK 25 Saint-Dizier
 PK 57 Autigny-le-Grand
 PK 72 Donjeux
 PK 109.4 Chaumont
 PK 152.5 beginning of summit level 
 PK 155-160 Balesmes tunnel
 PK 163 end of summit level
 PK 222.5 Maxilly-sur-Saône
 PK 224 Ends at the right-angle junction with the Heuilley lock-cut on the Petite Saône

See also
List of canals in France

References

External links 

 Canal entre Champagne et Bourgogne guide with maps and details of places, ports and moorings on the canal, by the author of Inland Waterways of France, Imray
 Navigation details for 80 French rivers and canals (French waterways website section)

Canals in France
Canals opened in 1907